Gibson Township is one of the fourteen townships of Mercer County, Ohio, United States.  The 2000 census found 1,869 people in the township, 997 of whom lived in the unincorporated portions of the township.

Geography
Located in the southwestern corner of the county, it borders the following townships:
Recovery Township - north
Granville Township - east
Allen Township, Darke County - southeast
Mississinawa Township, Darke County - south
Madison Township, Jay County, Indiana - west
Noble Township, Jay County, Indiana - northwest corner

Part of the village of Fort Recovery is located in northwestern Gibson Township.

Name and history
It is the only Gibson Township statewide.

Government
The township is governed by a three-member board of trustees, who are elected in November of odd-numbered years to a four-year term beginning on the following January 1. Two are elected in the year after the presidential election and one is elected in the year before it. There is also an elected township fiscal officer, who serves a four-year term beginning on April 1 of the year after the election, which is held in November of the year before the presidential election. Vacancies in the fiscal officership or on the board of trustees are filled by the remaining trustees.

References

External links
County website

Townships in Mercer County, Ohio
Townships in Ohio